Dishmok District is a district (bakhsh) in Kohgiluyeh County, Kohgiluyeh and Boyer-Ahmad Province, Iran. At the 2006 census, its population was 20,626, in 3,685 families.  The District has one city: Dishmok. The District has three rural districts (dehestan): Ajam Rural District, Bahmayi-ye Sarhadi-ye Gharbi Rural District, and Bahmayi-ye Sarhadi-ye Sharqi Rural District.

References 

Districts of Kohgiluyeh and Boyer-Ahmad Province
Kohgiluyeh County